Umuokeh or Umuoke is a village situated in Obowo local government area of Imo state, Nigeria.

Hamlets of Umuoke village include: Ogbaedere, Umueba, Umu-oyiocha, Umueze, Umunam, Umuezariam, Umueba etc. The people are very hospitable and it has a beautiful undulating landscape of hills and rivers. Christ the King Catholic Church is one famous site to visit. It is an ancient missionary church dating back to 1940. This church is located near the boundary between Umuokeh and Umulogho. 

Umuahia, the state capital of Abia, is just five kilometers from Umuokeh.

References 

Towns in Imo State
Villages in Igboland